Mumindalen ("Moomivalley"), also known as Jul i Mumindalen ("Christmas in Moomivalley") was the Sveriges Television's Christmas calendar in 1973. The series is a live-action show based on the Moomin characters. The actors were wearing suits, and voices were recorded later.

Episodes
 Det ensamma mumintrollet
 Det förtrollade badhuset
 Lilla My åker kana
 Den stora kölden
 Isfrun kommer
 Den stora brasan
 Möte med en förfader
 Knytt och hemuler
 Vad ska vi göra med hemulen?
 Snöstorm
 På väg tillsammans
 Den första våren
 Muminmamman
 Förfäder och sonsöner
 Vårvisan
 Förfadern försvinner
 Sommar i mumindalen
 På en obebodd ö
 Åska
 En vacker dam flyter iland
 Det osynliga barnet
 Att våga bli arg
 Det farliga kommer
 Julafton

Home media
The series was released to VHS and DVD on 26 October 2005. Prior to that, it was screened in Iceland in 1993 becoming the very first imported series of any Jóladagatal Sjónvarpsins, as there wouldn’t be another import from another country in Jóladagatal Sjónvarpsins ever again until 2001. Since 2010, it became a trend in recent years ever since.

References

1973 Swedish television series debuts
1973 Swedish television series endings
Sveriges Television's Christmas calendar
Swedish television shows featuring puppetry
Television shows based on children's books
Moomin television series
Christmas television series